The 2021 Rally Finland (also known as the Secto Rally Finland 2021) was a motor racing event for rally cars that was held over three days between 1 and 3 October 2021. It marked the seventieth running of the Rally Finland. The event was the tenth round of the 2021 World Rally Championship, World Rally Championship-2 and World Rally Championship-3. The 2021 event was based in Jyväskylä in Central Finland and was contested over nineteen special stages totalling  in competitive distance.

Ott Tänak and Martin Järveoja were the defending rally winners. Kalle Rovanperä and Jonne Halttunen were the defending winners in the WRC-2 category, but they did not defend their titles as they were promoted to the top class by Toyota. In the WRC-3 category, Tom Kristensson and Henrik Appelskog were the reigning rally winners, but they did not defend their titles neither as Kristensson was promoted to the WRC-2 class by M-Sport Ford World Rally Team.

Elfyn Evans and Scott Martin won the rally for the first time and their second of their season. Their team, Toyota Gazoo Racing WRT, successfully defended their titles. In the World Rally Championship-2 category, Teemu Suninen and Mikko Markkula won the event. The local crew of Emil Lindholm and Reeta Hämäläinen took their maiden victory in the World Rally Championship-3 category.

Background

Championship standings prior to the event
Reigning World Champions Sébastien Ogier and Julien Ingrassia entered the round with a forty-four-point lead over Elfyn Evans and Scott Martin. Thierry Neuville and Martijn Wydaeghe were third, a further six points behind. In the World Rally Championship for Manufacturers, Toyota Gazoo Racing WRT held a massive fifty-seven-point lead over defending manufacturers' champions Hyundai Shell Mobis WRT, followed by M-Sport Ford WRT.

In the World Rally Championship-2 standings, Andreas Mikkelsen led Marco Bulacia Wilkinson by twenty-two points in the drivers' championship, with Mads Østberg in third. In the co-drivers' championship Marcelo Der Ohannesian held a six-point lead over Ola Fløene, with Torstein Eriksen in third.

In the World Rally Championship-3 standings, Yohan Rossel led Kajetan Kajetanowicz by fifteen points in the drivers' championship, with Nicolas Ciamin in third. In the co-drivers' championship Maciek Szczepaniak held a thirteen-point lead over Alexandre Coria, with Yannick Roche in third.

Entry list
The following crews entered the rally. The event was open to crews competing in the World Rally Championship, its support categories, the World Rally Championship-2 and World Rally Championship-3, and privateer entries that were not registered to score points in any championship. Nine entries for the World Rally Championship are received, as were eight in the World Rally Championship-2 and fourteen in the World Rally Championship-3.

Route

Itinerary
All dates and times are EEST (UTC+3).

Report

World Rally Cars

Classification

Special stages

Championship standings

World Rally Championship-2

Classification

Special stages

Championship standings

World Rally Championship-3

Classification

Special stages

Championship standings

Notes

References

External links

  
 2021 Rally Finland at eWRC-results.com
 The official website of the World Rally Championship

2021 in Finnish sport
Finland
October 2021 sports events in Finland
2021